Asterogyne yaracuyense is a species of flowering plant in the family Arecaceae. It is found only in Venezuela. It is threatened by habitat loss.

References

[[Category:Asterogyne}yaracuyense]]
Flora of Venezuela
Critically endangered plants
Taxonomy articles created by Polbot